John Hannigan (1938/9 – 22 April 2014) was an Irish Gaelic footballer who played for St Eunan's and the Donegal county team.

A versatile player, Hannigan began his career in midfield but played everywhere from corner back to corner-forward.

He played as corner forward in the final of the 1956 Ulster Minor Football Championship, which Donegal won.

He played 114 times for Donegal and made 27 Championship appearances between 1958 and 1973.

Hannigan played for Donegal in the 1964–65 National Football League semi-final against Kerry, scoring 1–0.

He won the 1972 Ulster Senior Football Championship with Donegal.

Hannigan managed Donegal in 1975 and 1976. He also pursued an interest in golf.

Hannigan died in Dublin aged 75 after suffering a heart attack in April 2014. Married to Claire, they had a son Damien and a daughter Adrianne. He is buried at Conwal Cemetery.

Honours
Donegal
 Ulster Senior Football Championship: 1972
 Ulster Minor Football Championship: 1956
 Dr McKenna Cup: 1963, 1965, 1967
 Dr Lagan Cup: 1965, 1966, 1967
 Donegal Senior Football Championship x5
 Democrat Cup x3

References

1930s births
2014 deaths
Donegal inter-county Gaelic footballers
Gaelic football utility players
Irish nurses
People from Letterkenny
Psychiatric nurses
St Eunan's Gaelic footballers